Fares Maakaroun, (born October 12, 1940 in Rayak (Riyaq), Lebanon) was an Archbishop of the Melkite Greek Catholic Eparchy of Nossa Senhora do Paraíso em São Paulo in Brazil from 1999 to 2014, when presented his apostolic resignation.

Career
He attended the primary school of his native town and then moved on to secondary school in Harissa. After the school, Maakaroun went as a novice to the White Fathers in Gap (France). He studied from 1960 philosophy and theology at the seminary of the White Fathers in Jerusalem and received a licentiate in theology. Maakaroun received his priestly ordination on 18 December 1966. Prior to his appointment as bishop in 1995, he was a professor at the seminary in Harissa, director of the Seminary of Damascus, Secretary General of Caritas Lebanon and finally Vicar General in Latakia in Syria.

Bishop Offices

On 31 July 1995 Maakaroun received the appointment as Archbishop of Latakia in Syria and on 17 December 1995 by Patriarch Maximos V Hakim was consecrated Archbishop. His co-consecrators were Archbishop (emeritus) Michel Yatim of Latakia and Archbishop Jean Mansour, SMSP, Titular Archbishop of Apamea of Greek Melkites and Auxiliary Bishop of Antioch. On 18 December 1999, Maakaroun received the appointment as Archbishop "Pro hac vice", as Bishop of the Melkite Greek Catholic Church in Brazil. In this role he was co-consecrator of Archbishop Nikolaki Sawaf of Latakia. In October 2010, he participated in the Special Assembly of the Synod of Bishops on the Middle East in Rome. His objections to the final protocol was the call to engage in love for peace - but, he argued that "... there is no true love without true holiness. Let us be holy as our heavenly Father is holy. Holiness is the solution. Yes, sacred love, this is the solution." On July 21, 2014, Fares Maakaroun presented his apostolic resignation and was succeeded by his assistant, Joseph Gébara.

References

External links

 Archbishop Fares Maakaroun [Catholic-Hierarchy]
 Hierarchy of the Greek Melkite Catholic Church

1940 births
Eastern Catholic bishops in Brazil
Melkite Greek Catholic bishops
Living people
Brazilian Melkite Greek Catholics
People from Zahle District
Lebanese emigrants to Brazil
Eastern Catholic bishops in Syria
Lebanese Eastern Catholic bishops